is a Japanese professional sumo wrestler from Iwanai, Hokkaido. A former amateur wrestler at Chuo University, he made his professional debut in January 2017, reaching the top makuuchi division in July 2021. His highest rank has been maegashira 13. He wrestles for Hanaregoma stable.

Career
Yamamoto did amateur sumo at university but then became a civil servant, and had to get special dispensation from the Japan Sumo Association to join professionally as he was over the age limit of 23. He made his professional debut in 2017, wrestling with the Nishonoseki stable (now re-named Hanaregoma stable) and he won the jonokuchi division championship in his first tournament. He reached the top makuuchi division in July 2021.  He began his top division career with a win over Ishiura with a rare backwards belt throw, or harimanage. He reached seven wins and two losses by Day 9, but then suffered five straight defeats and only secured his kachi-koshi or majority of wins on the final day. The September 2021 tournament was less successful for him as he could win only four matches and was demoted back to jūryō. However in November he earned immediate promotion back to the top division by taking the jūryō division championship or yūshō with a 13–2 record.

Ichiyamamoto began the May 2022 tournament with five straight wins, and on Day 10 was the co-leader with Takanoshō on eight wins and two losses. However he lost his last five matches to finish with an 8–7 record.

Ichiyamamoto and his stable were forced to withdraw on Day 9 of the July 2022 tournament in Nagoya after stablemaster Hanaregoma tested positive for COVID-19. Ichiyamamato stood at six wins and two losses at the time, and his ranking for the September tournament was once again East Maegashira 13 (although he was two spots closer to jūryō because of the increased size of sanyaku).

Fighting style
Ichiyamamoto is a tsuki/oshi type wrestler, who prefers thrusting and pushing his opponents to fighting on the mawashi. He wins most of his bouts by oshidashi (push out), hatakikomi (slap down) or tsuki dashi (thrust out).

Career record

See also
Glossary of sumo terms
List of active sumo wrestlers
List of sumo tournament second division champions

References

External links

1993 births
Living people
Japanese sumo wrestlers
Sumo people from Hokkaido